Saints Peter and Paul Cathedral is a Roman Catholic cathedral located at Fourteenth and Meridian Streets in Indianapolis, Indiana, United States. It is the seat of the Archdiocese of Indianapolis, and of the Archbishop of Indianapolis, most recently Archbishop Charles C. Thompson. Silas Chatard, the first Bishop of Indianapolis, established the cathedral parish in 1892, and named it after Saint Peter and Saint Paul, two apostles of Christ. The cathedral parish became known for its liturgical celebrations and sacred music performances.

The architectural firm of Renwick, Aspinwall and Russell, W. L. Coulter of New York designed the Classical Revival-style cathedral, adjacent chapel, and bishop's residence (rectory). The cathedral complex was built in stages. The rectory and chapel were completed in 1892. The cathedral and a temporary facade were built between 1905 and 1907; the permanent facade was erected in 1936. The high altar of the unfinished cathedral was consecrated on December 21, 1906. William Whetten Renwick, nephew of American architect James Renwick Jr., was responsible for the cathedral project and designed its original interior decoration. The Indianapolis architectural firm of D. A. Bohlen and Son was local supervisor for construction of the chapel, rectory, and cathedral, and also designed some of the interior furnishings. August Bohlen supervised construction of the permanent facade.

History

Cathedral parish

The Saints Peter and Paul Parish dates to 1892, when Silas Chatard, fifth Bishop of Vincennes, formally established the new parish in a residential neighborhood north of downtown Indianapolis. In the early 1870s Bishop Jacques Maurice de St. Palais considered Indianapolis as the new seat of the Diocese of Vincennes, but deferred the decision to Bishop Chatard, his successor. Immediately after Chatard's consecration as Bishop of Vincennes on May 12, 1878, he established his residence in Indianapolis at Saint John the Evangelist Church, which served as the pro-cathedral for the diocese in Indianapolis from 1878 to 1906, when Saints Peter and Paul Cathedral was built. Saint Francis Xavier Cathedral at Vincennes, Indiana, remained the official cathedral church for the diocese until 1898, when the episcopal see was transferred to Indianapolis and became the Diocese of Indianapolis.

The parish cathedral complex was completed in phases. On August 16, 1890, Bishop Chatard purchased five lots at Fourteenth and Meridian Streets for $32,500, and paid for the property within three years from private donations. Construction for a chapel and rectory began in 1891 and was completed the following year. Anticipating the episcopal see's relocation from Vincennes to Indianapolis, Bishop Chatard purchased five more lots at Fourteenth and Meridian Streets for $22,000 in July 1894 to allow additional space for the cathedral. Four years later, on March 28, 1898, Pope Leo XIII officially transferred the seat of the Diocese of Vincennes to Indianapolis. Saints Peter and Paul became the cathedral parish for the diocese. The parish is known for its liturgical celebrations and sacred music.

Chapel and rectory
Construction of the parish chapel and rectory began on July 15, 1891. The chapel was dedicated on March 25, 1892; Bishop Chatard and Monsignor Auguste Bessonies moved into the rectory on April 18, 1892. In 1907 the chapel underwent a major renovation, but World War I delayed its completion until 1918. Bishop Chatard consecrated the Blessed Sacrament Chapel, as it was named after the renovation, on September 7, 1918.

Cathedral design and construction

Following the transfer of the diocese to Indianapolis in 1898, Bishop Chatard proceeded with plans to raise funds for a new cathedral. Saints Peter and Paul Cathedral was built between 1905 and 1907 with a temporary facade. Construction of a permanent facade and twin spires was postponed due to a shortage of funds. Bishop Joseph Ritter arranged for completion of the cathedral in 1936, when the permanent facade was erected. Major renovations and additions, including those made in 1915, 1936, and 1985, have altered the appearance of the cathedral's interior.

The architectural firm of Renwick, Aspinwall and Russell, W. L. Coulter of New York designed the Classical Revival-style cathedral, rectory, and adjacent chapel. It is believed that the cathedral is patterned after Saint John Lateran in Rome, Italy. (Bishop Chatard was ordained a priest at Saint John Lateran, which holds relics of Saints Peter and Paul.)

The original plan for the cathedral at Indianapolis was revised, most likely to reduce its construction costs. Modifications to the plan reduced the overall length and width of the cathedral and eliminated its domes and two side chapels. William Whetten Renwick, nephew of American architect James Renwick Jr., took over sole responsibility for the cathedral around 1900, a few years after James's death. The Indianapolis architectural firm of D. A. Bohlen and Son served as local supervisors for the construction project. William Renwick designed the cathedral's original interior décor, including three sanctuary altars, doorway and arch decoration, the metal ceiling, and frames for the Stations of the Cross. D. A. Bohlen and Son designed the interior's original holy water fonts and dark oak furnishings. The high altar of the unfinished cathedral was consecrated on December 21, 1906, in a private ceremony, and the first Pontifical High Mass at the new cathedral took place on December 25, 1906.

Indianapolis architect August Bohlen, grandson of D. A. Bohlen, supervised construction of the permanent façade in 1936. It was designed by Layton (Dick) DeMilt of the Bohlen architectural firm.

In 1985 Sovik Mathre Sathrum Quanbeck of Northfield, Minnesota, served as project architects and planners for a controversial renovation of the cathedral based on liturgical changes made at the Second Vatican Council. The project had a $1.7 million budget. The refurbished cathedral was rededicated on May 14, 1986.

Description

The cathedral is the main structure in a complex that also includes a three-story rectory, a two-story service wing, and an adjacent chapel.

Exterior and plan
Its walls and temporary facade were constructed of brick with limestone trim from Bedford, Indiana. The permanent facade is a Roman classical design in the Corinthian order. The facade has three portals. A U.S. coat of arms is over the north door; the seal of Indiana over the south door; and symbols of the Catholic Church (a ship, Christogram, labarum, and a Latin verse from I Timothy 3:15) over the middle door. The facade also includes two niches intended for statues of Saints Peter and Paul.

Interior

Several major renovations have altered the cathedral's interior decoration. The original interior had tinted walls with ivory accents, and the heads of angels topped the panes between its windows. Side altars were installed in 1908. The original dark oak furnishings, which included pews, pulpit, confessional, confessional rails, a bishop's throne and canopy, sedilia, choir stalls, and vestment case, have been removed or replaced. Edgar S. Cameron of Chicago originally painted the upper apse in an early Byzantine style with Christ at the center, flanked by Mary (mother of Jesus) and Saint Peter on the left and Saint Joseph and Saint Paul on the right. In 1936 Cameron's murals were covered with glass mosaics that depicted Christ in Majesty, flanked by Saints Peter and Paul. The original terrazzo flooring, divided with light purple bands, and the marble high altar were replaced in a subsequent renovation.

Bishop Chatard commissioned Cesare Aureli, a Roman sculptor, to carve the Blessed Mother and Child statue and the Saint Joseph statue in white Carrara marble. They were installed around 1909. Aureli's statue of Saint Frances de Sales (Bishop Chatard's patron saint) was delivered in 1911, and installed on the high altar. In 1915 a life-size Crucifixion was installed above the main altar. The sanctuary also includes a copy of Antonio Montauti's Pietà.

Art-glass windows, which were initially installed in 1906, were replaced in the late 1920s, or early 1930s. The Rambusch Decorating Company of New York designed twenty-one new stained-glass windows that included depictions of Saints Peter and Paul; the coats of arms of Bishop Chatard, Bishop Joseph Chartrand, Pope Pius X, and Pope Pius XI; symbols of the Four Evangelists; and wheat and grapes to symbolize the Eucharist. The façade window in the organ gallery depicted Christ the King and Bishop Ritter's coat of arms.

In a sanctuary renovation made in 1936 the floor was extended over the original stairway and covered in marble, the cathedrals walls were faced with marble, and a new baptistry was installed. The renovation also redesigned William Renwick's original Stations of the Cross. The cathedral's organ, originally installed in 1907, was rebuilt as a part of the interior renovation.

In 1940 a Madonna of the Forest painting, attributed to fifteenth-century Venetian artist Giovanni Bellini, was presented as a gift to the church. The painting was restored and removed for safekeeping in 1974.

Significant renovations made in 1985 and 1986 included a major redecoration of the sanctuary and structural repairs to the exterior and interior. Changes to the sanctuary included relocation of some of its statuary; a new color scheme, flooring, and lighting; removal of the original pews; addition of a white oak, marble-topped altar; replacement of the marble bishop's throne with a white oak chair; and a new lectern to replace the massive marble pulpit.

Rectory
The main entrance from Meridian Street opens into a wide interior corridor. The first floor's original plan had double parlors on the north, a reception room and bishop's study on the south, and a dining rom at the end of the corridor in the building's service area. The second floor included the bishop's quarters on the west and bedrooms on the north and east sides. The third floor, which was later remodeled into sleeping rooms, included four storage rooms with a large library at the center.

Blessed Sacrament Chapel 

The chapel, which measures 80 feet by 34 feet, has a main entrance flanked by double columns that support an arched roof. The interior, which underwent a major renovation in 1918, is decorated in Venetian mosaics. Bernard Mellerio painted the walls with eleven Fra Angelico-style angels based on the originals in San Marco, Florence. Art-glass designs once included the Sacred Heart flanked by angels, the Blessed Sacrament, and a Christogram. With the exception of the Sacred Heart window, they were replaced in 1923 with new designs that depicted, among others, the Last Supper, Christ and his disciples, Emmaus, Monstrance, and angels.

Membership
Parish membership reached a total of 4,950 in 1928, but it steadily declined after a peak of 4,684 members in 1949. Membership fell to 3,000 by 1960; 1,500 by 1970; and 289 by 1984. As of 2015 parish membership includes 165 families. The decline in membership has been attributed to the deaths of longtime members, parish families moving to the suburbs, a declining neighborhood around the cathedral, and a general urban decline. In an effort to revitalize the cathedral parish, the cathedral complex underwent a major renovation in 1985 and 1986.

Ordinations
Bishop Joseph Chartrand, the second Bishop of Indianapolis, was ordained a priest in the Saints Peter and Paul chapel on September 24, 1892. He was appointed as rector of the cathedral on December 26, 1905, and named coadjutor bishop and Bishop Chatard's successor on June 27, 1910. Chartrand governed the diocese on the bishop's behalf until Chatard's death on September 7, 1918. Chartrand was consecrated as Bishop of Indianapolis at the cathedral on September 15, 1910.

Joseph Elmer Ritter, the first Archbishop of Indianapolis, was named rector of the cathedral on August 25, 1925. He was consecrated auxiliary bishop for the Diocese of Indianapolis at the cathedral in 1933, and was appointed Bishop of Indianapolis on March 26, 1934. When the diocese was elevated to an archdiocese on November 17, 1944, Ritter became its archbishop.

Bishops Chatard and Chartrand were initially buried in the cathedral's crypt. In 1976 their remains were removed and interred at the Calvary Cemetery's mausoleum chapel in Indianapolis.

See also
List of churches in the Roman Catholic Archdiocese of Indianapolis
List of Catholic cathedrals in the United States
List of cathedrals in the United States

Notes

References
 
 
 
 
 
 
 *

External links
Official Cathedral Site
Roman Catholic Archdiocese of Indianapolis Official Site
SS. Peter & Paul Cathedral Photo Gallery, The Catholic Photographer

Religious organizations established in 1892
1892 establishments in Indiana
Roman Catholic churches completed in 1907
Peter and Paul, Indianapolis
Neoclassical architecture in Indiana
Roman Catholic churches in Indianapolis
History of Catholicism in Indiana
20th-century Roman Catholic church buildings in the United States
Neoclassical church buildings in the United States